Sevenia morantii, the obscure tree nymph or Morant's tree nymph, is a butterfly in the family Nymphalidae found in southern Africa.

Wingspan: 40–45 mm in males and 43–50 mm in females. Flight period year round but mainly between December and May.

The larvae feed on Macaranga kilimandscharica, Excoecaria bussei and Sapium species (including S. ellipticum).

References

morantii
Butterflies described in 1881
Butterflies of Africa
Taxa named by Roland Trimen